Sisyrinchium micranthum, commonly known as  blue pigroot or striped rush-leaf, is a grass-like species in the iris family, Iridaceae. It is native to Mexico, Central America, and South America and widely naturalised elsewhere. The white to cream flowers are between 10 and 20 mm in diameter and have blue to purple centres. These are followed by rounded 3 to 8 mm brown capsules that enclose the dark brown seeds.

References

micranthum
Flora naturalised in Australia
Flora of Mexico
Flora of Central America
Flora of South America
Plants described in 1788
Taxa named by Antonio José Cavanilles